Blažej Baláž (born 29 October 1958 in Nevoľné, Slovakia, former Czechoslovakia) is a contemporary Slovak artist. His practise as an artist is usually associated with political art, environmental, activist, mail-art and neo-conceptualism. After 1988 he began working with text as art, neo-conceptual and post-conceptual texts (intext, outtext).

Life and work
Baláž studied at the Academy of Fine Arts, Bratislava and his Magister of Fine Arts degree received in 1983. Baláž has been the Head of Department of Fine Arts Education at the University of Trnava since 1999. He was a founder member of the artists group East of Eden (1998). Since 1979, he has been married to the artist Mária Balážová.

He lives and works in Trnava.

He has worked in the areas of political, environmental, activist and neo-conceptual art. His practice also comprises media painting, works on paper, performances, drawing, object, mail art and printmaking.

He has shown work internationally in exhibitions including the Drawing 1990, Provo, USA (1990), Vth International Drawing Triennale, Wrocław (1992), 12th International Biennale of Small Sculpture, Murska Sobota (1995), International Biennale of Graphic Arts, Ljubljana (1989, 1995, 1999), Object / Object. Prague, Czech Museum of Fine Arts (2001), Intertext / From the conceptual to postconceptual text, Ján Koniarek Gallery, Trnava (2009), Formats of Transformation 89 – 09 / Seven views on the new Czech and Slovak identity, House of Art, Brno (2009).

Solo exhibitions (retrospective): Geld macht Kunst, Ján Koniarek Gallery, Trnava (2003) , Blažej Baláž Texts 1988/2007, The East Slovak Gallery, Košice (2007), Museum of Fine Arts, Žilina (2007), SUCHARATOLEST House of Art, Bratislava (2009), WARTEZEIT, Slowakisches Institut Wien (2009), Post-Geo-Text (with Mária Balážová), Slowakisches Institut Berlin (2011).

His works are held in the public collections of Slovak National Gallery, Bratislava, National Gallery in Prague (CZ), Muzeum Archidiecezjalne, Katowice (PL), Fries Museum, Leeuwarden (NL), Jan Koniarek Gallery, Trnava , East Slovakian Gallery Košice, City Gallery , Bratislava, Central Slovakian Gallery, Banská Bystrica .

Cycle Treptomachia
Baláž's works brings the new possibilities at the field of post-conceptual and neo-conceptual text. The exhibition is divided in three segments, all of them are connected by the specific and authentic search of the possibilities in the conceptual Macaronic language.
The first is created from the neo-conceptual horizontal/vertical texts, a part of Treptomachia, (WARTEZEIT, 2006, WARTERAUM, 2006 and How to domesticate the English language, 2006). The internal orientation of artworks, the search of art itself, the search of language and text brings the cracking of syntactic/semantic wholeness of graphems. The metatexts of initial prototext are distinguished by the colors (oil on canvas, 300 x 200 cm).
In this regard Baláž's eff ort culminates by the diptych TREPTOMACHIA.EN-A / How to domesticate the English language and TREPTOMACHIA.DE-B / How to domesticate the German language (2006). Both are depicted on big-size canvas, within which the only dominating word with partial messages is replaced with newly defined optical language with tens of words. The colour decomposition of the grapheme creates a symptomatic background for language overlapping and the contamination, which creates the supreme moment of the author's Babylonian crossroads.
Another, the second segment, black and white acryl-paintings enriches the former one, the artworks are created on principle of the structuralist analysis of text. It is a variant, which is called and named by author and curator the intext. By the segmentation of text the author discovers several lexis. These have a different lexical origin, five West-European, five East-European, and „dead“ language of Medieval Esperanto – Latin. Despite the cold artificiality of works, this segment has also the hidden sociocritical context, which is oscillated between phenomenons West and East, art and politics.
The third segment is the most open and subjective. These horizontal texts are named by its author as the simultaneous texts. It is a different alternative in the post-conceptual Makaronian text, the melange is created by harmony of the initial and derivative text. Its ironic and attacking character replaces a cold aspect of the first two segments. Vajanský's Suchá ratolesť (an ironic parallel of failing elits) is floundered by streams, the subject is named by the author as east rat in the age of 20-years of wandering a la democrazy, with a more complicated ambivalent reading. The fragility of ground – paper [four artworks, width 10 m] raises the openness of statement, ODRBMADEMOKRATICKY, 2008 [screw me over democratically], is predominative.

Selected solo exhibitions
 Blažej Baláž / Painting, drawing, installations, Central Slovakian Gallery, Banská Bystrica, 1 July - 16 August 1992 (catalogue)
 Postscriptum II, City Gallery of Bratislava, Bratislava, 16 December 1993 – 30 January 1994
 Gutten Tag, Frau Koppl, Jan Koniarek Gallery, Trnava, 18 February  – 23 March 1997
 Geld macht frei, Vojtech Löffler Museum, Košice, 15 November  – 30 December 2000 (catalogue)
 Mária and Blažej Baláž : The Discreet Charm of the Painting , House of Art, Česke Budějovice, 27 March – 21 April 2002
 Geld macht Kunst, Jan Koniarek Gallery, Trnava, 12 June – 18 August 2003
 Texts 1988 / 2007, The East-Slovakian Gallery, Košice, 21 June – 23 July 2007 (catalogue);
 Texts 1988 / 2007, Museum of Fine Arts, Žilina, 13 September – 14 October 2007 (catalogue);
 SUCHARATOLEST, House of Art, Bratislava, 13 May – 8 June 2009
 WARTERAUM , Slowakisches Institut, Vienna, 27 May – 22 June 2009 (catalogue);
 Conceptual texts, Liptov Gallery of P. M. Bohúň, Liptovský Mikuláš, 10 February – 9 April 2011
 Mária Balážová-Blažej Baláž : Post-Geo-Text, Slowakisches Institut, Berlin, 14 April – 30 May 2011
 EINEMU, Nitra Gallery, Nitra, 31 May – 22 July 2012 
 Travesties, Turiec Gallery, Martin, 18 July – 15 September 2013
 Private/Public, Gallery of Art, Nové Zámky, 21 May – 24 June 2015
 When Activism Becomes Art, Central Slovakian Gallery, Banská Bystrica, 24 September - 8 November 2015  
 ghOstwriter, Central Slovakian Gallery, Banská Bystrica, 24 April - 17 June 2018

Selected group exhibitions
Art Basel 19´88, Basel, Switzerland, 1988
12th International Print Biennale, Cracow, BWA (PL), 1988
18th International Print Biennale, Moderna galerija, Ljubljana, Slovenia, 1989
Ľ Europe des Graveurs, Grenoble, Bibliothèque Municipale, France, 1989
Drawing 1990, Provo, Utah, USA, 1990
9.Internationale Grafik Triennale, Frechen, Kunstferein zu Frechen, Germany, 1990
International Print Triennale, Cracow, Bunkier Sztuki (PL), 1991
Vth International Drawing Triennale, Wroclaw, Poland, 1992
12th International Biennale of Small Sculpture, Murska Sobota, Slovenia, 1995
Seitenwechsel, Heidelberg, Heidelberger Schlos, Germany, 1995
21st International Print Biennale, Ljubljana, Moderna Galerija (SL), 1995
Picturale, Est, Strasbourg, France, 1997
23rd International Biennial of Graphic Arts, Ljubljana, Moderna galerija (SL), 1999
Object / Object. Metamorphoses in Time, The Czech Museum of Fine Arts, Prague, Czech Republic, 2001
The Art of Action, 1989–2000, Poprad, Tatra Gallery, Nitra, Nitra Gallery, 2001
New End of Painting, Trnava, Jan Koniarek Gallery, 2002
Contemporary Slovak Painting 2000-2005, City Gallery of Prague, Prague, Czech Republic, 2005
Slovak Graphic Art of the 20th Century, City Gallery, Bratislava, Slovakia, 2007
Intertext / From conceptual to postconceptual text, Jan Koniarek Gallery, Trnava, Slovakia, 2009
Formate der Transformation 89-09, MUSA - Museum auf Abruf, Vienna, Austria, 2010
After Hours : Phase 2 / Artists from Slovakia, Santa Ana, Orange County Center for Contemporary Art, USA, 2010
1st International Biennial of Drawing, Municipal Museum, Győr, Hungary, 2011
Daisies and Clones, Slovak National Gallery, Bratislava, Slovakia, 2011
ObraSKov, Wannieck Gallery, Brno, Czech Republic, 2011
5th International Drawing Competition Wroclaw 2012, Muzeum Architektury, Wroclaw, Poland, 2012
Blood, Slovak National Gallery, Bratislava, Slovakia, 2012
IX. International Biennial of Drawing Pilsen 2014, Pilsen, Czech Republic, 2014
Here and Now, Budapest, Kunsthalle (HU), 2015
5th International Drawing Triennial: Black and White, Tallinn Art Hall, Tallinn, Estonia, 2015
Osten Biennial of Drawing, Skopje (MK), 2016
Socially alive, Gallery of Slovak Visual Artists, Bratislava, 2016
International Print Triennial Krakow 2018, Krakow, Poland, 2018
International Drawing Biennale India 2018-19, New Delhi (India), 2019
SIGNAL – The Story of (Post-) conceptual art in Slovakia, Budapest, Ludwig Museum (HU), 2019

Awards
 1987 Honorable Mention, Biennale of Slovak Graphic Art IX, Banská Bystrica
 1987 3rd Prize for Printmaking, Competition of Slovakian Fine Artists, Bratislava
 1989 Purchase Prize, 9è Mini Print Internacional, Cadaqués (E)
 1989 1st Prize for Painting, Competition of West-Slovakian Fine Artists, Trenčín
 1990 Award of Excellence, 6th International Miniature Print Biennale, Seoul ( South Korea)
 1995 Award of The Masaryk's Academy of Arts, Prague (CZ)
 1996 Prize Ex Aequo, Biennale of Slovak Graphic Art XIII, Banská Bystrica
 2005 The Jury's Award, Biennale of small graphics GRAFIX, Břeclav (CZ)
 2005 Award of The City Banská Bystrica, Triennial of Slovak Graphic Art XVI, Banská Bystrica
 2008 Award of The City Trnava
 2014 Prize of the Czech Union of Visual Artists of the Czech Republic, 9th International Biennial of Drawing Pilsen (CZ)
 2016 Special Award by the Jury - Osten Biennial of Drawing 2016, Skopje (MK)

Collections  
 Slovak National Gallery, Bratislava
 Galéria mesta Bratislavy, Bratislava                                                                              
 East-Slovakian Gallery, Košice
 Central Slovakian Gallery, Banská Bystrica
 J. Koniarek Gallery, Trnava       
 M. A. Bazovský Gallery, Trenčín
 National Gallery, Praha (CZ)
 Moravská galerie, Brno (CZ)
 Osten Museum of Drawing, Skopje (MK)
 Muzeum Archidiecezjalne, Katowice (PL)
 Miejska Galeria Sztuki, Lodž (PL)
 Cremona Civic Museum, Prints Cabinet (I)
 Friske Museum, Leuwarden (N)

Works
 Mechanical Paradise (1988/1990)
 HROBONJOUR (1992) 
 My Way (1993 - ) 
 Artwart (1997) 
 Skarabeus (1997)  
 Memory 2 / Unpowdered painting (1998)
 Mandala 4 / Black (1997/2000) 
 Geld macht frei (2001) 
 Mandala 5 (2001) 
 Poppy Seed Field (2001/02)- Monochrome painting 
 CLEANMONEY (2002) 
 Mandala 15 (2003) 
 GODSAVEUS (2003) 
 The Art of kill (2004) 
 WETRUSTIN (2004–07)
 Treptomachia. EN – A / How to domesticate the English language (2005/06)             	
 Treptomachia. DE – B / How to domesticate the German language (2006)
 WARTERAUM (2007)
 WARTEZEIT (2007)
 SUCHARATOLEST (2008)
 SLOVENSKY (2006/09)
 BESTEHLEN (2007/09) 
 BESTOCKEN (2007/09)
 EINEMU (2011)
 Treptomachia.En - Wart (2011)
 Treptomachia.Sk - Vanitas (2011)
 Art after Poetry 6 / IAMAPHERIPHERALARTIST (2011–12)
 Art after Poetry 7 / IAMAPSEUDOCONCEPTUALARTIST (2012) 
 Art after Poetry 8 / IAMACHECHEN (2012)
 WHYENTARTAINMENT, 2013 
 Travesty.wd.5 / EINTOTESKAPITALKUNSTEMU (2013 /14)

Books, catalogues
 VALOCH, J. – VARTECKÁ, A. 2003. Blažej Baláž. Trnava : Trnava University, East of Eden, 132 p. (In English and Slovak) 
 BESKID, V. – GAJDOŠ, R. 2007. Blažej Baláž : Texts 1988 /2007. Trnava : East of Eden, Trnava University, 48 p. (In English and Slovak) 
 BALÁŽ, B. 2009. The Texts of the Texts. Trnava : Trnava University, 30 p. 
 ORIŠKOVÁ, M. – GAJDOŠ, R. – BALÁŽ, B. 2016. Blažej Baláž – My Way. Trnava : Typi Universitatis Tyrnaviensis, 202 p.

References

Further reading
 ž.u.m. (= URRA MUENA, Ž.).1992. Blažej Baláž. In Saur Allgemeines Künstler – Lexikon, band 6. Mϋnchen, Leipzig : K.G.Saur. (D)
 BARTOŠOVÁ, Z. 1995. Blažej Baláž. In 12th International Biennial of Small Sculpture. Murska Sobota : Galerija Murska Sobota, p. 158-159 (SL)
 GERŽOVÁ, J. 1999. Junk art. In Dictionary of World and Slovak Fine Art in the 2nd half of the 20th century. Bratislava : Kruh súčasného umenia Profil, p. 285
 VRBANOVÁ, A. 2000. New Form in Graphic Art. In RUSINOVÁ, Z. et al. 2000. Art of the 20th century. Bratislava : Slovak National Gallery, p. 114-116
 VALOCH, J. 2001. The Connotation of Powdered Painting. In Ateliér, vol.14, no.6, 22.3.2001, p. 9, Prague (CZ)
 BESKID, V. 2003. Geld macht Kunst. Macht Kunst Geld? In Profil, vol. X, no.2/2003, p. 128-131
 ADAM, R. – ROBERTSON, C. 2007. Intaglio. London : Thames & Hudson, p. 29 (UK)
 BÖHMEROVÁ, Z. – JANČÁR, I. 2007. Slovak Graphics of the 20th Century. Bratislava : City Gallery, 2007, p. 195, 285, 304, 312
  BARTOŠOVÁ, Z. 2007. 20th Century. In Art in Slovakia / Summary History of Pictures. Bratislava. Bratislava : Slovart, p. 224
 GAJDOŠ, R. 2008. The projection of linguistic thinking to contemporary fine arts.. In SCHNEIDER, J. – KRAUSOVA, L. 2008 (eds). Intermediality: Word – image – sound. Olomouc : University of J. E. Palacký, 334 p. [p. 223-229] (CZ)
 VALOCH, J. 2009. Venice In-Between Geometry and Concept. Ateliér, vol.22, no.18, p. 4, 10.9.2009 (CZ)
  GERŽOVÁ, B. 2009. From plaster to chewing gum – Author's techniques, Nitra : Nitra Gallery, p. 5, 9, 44, 45
  BESKID, V. 2009. From a Political Space toward a Public One. In KOWOLOWSKI, F. (ed.) 2009. Formats of Transformation 89 – 09 / Seven views on the new Czech and Slovak identity. Brno : House of Art, p. 14 – 17, 200 (CZ)
  KNÍŽÁK, M. – VLČEK, T. (eds.). 2009. 909 / Art from the Turn of the Millennium in the National Gallery in Prague 1990 - 2009. Prague - National Gallery, p. 362 (CZ)
  GAJDOŠ, R. 2010. Conceptual Text / Genesis and Metamorphosis. Trnava : Typi Universitatis Tyrnaviensis and Veda, p. 11, 12, 76, 87, 89, 99, 101, 104, 105, 128 (SK)
  BESKID, V. 2012. Rónaiová's Cuts by Social Art. In Veronika Rónaiová's Social Investigation 2. Trnava : Typi Universitatis Tyrnaviensis, p. 6-7
  GAJDOŠ, R. 2012. In Veronika Rónaiová's Social Investigation 2. Trnava : Typi Universitatis Tyrnaviensis, p. 10, 13
  GREGOROVÁ, L. 2012. In. BURAN, D. (ed.). 2012. Blood. Bratislava : Slovak National Gallery, p. 86-87
 BESKID, V. 2012. The image of painting in the „Picture du nouveau“. In ObraSKovo nanovo / Contemporary Slovak Painting.  Poprad : Tatranská  Gallery, p. 15
 MICHÁLEK, O. 2016. Magie otisku. Grafické techniky a technologie tisku. Brno : Barrister & Principal, s. 246, 248, 249 
 GAJDOŠ, R. 2016. In Opposite Direction. In Protocollum 2016/2017. Berlin : Dickersbach Kunstverlag, p. 94-97

External links
 http://www.bbalaz.sk/
 http://www.artfacts.net/en/artist/blazej-balaz-165810/profile.html
 http://www.kunstaspekte.de/index.php?k=8735&action=webpages
 http://www.artgallery.sk/pouzivatel.php?ArtGallery_Session=f82e20a9e6d69f7b28890e45fd3bd3f1&getPouzivatel=764
 http://www.osobnosti.sk/index.php?os=zivotopis&ID=59280&mainkat=4
 :sk:Blažej Baláž
 https://web.archive.org/web/20080617073554/http://pdfweb.truni.sk/fak/katedry/kpvu/bbalaz/index.html
 http://www.gjk.sk/en/exhibition/archive-of-expositions/2009/intertext/
 https://web.archive.org/web/20080918075827/http://www.pgu.sk/archive/2007/balaz.htm
 Monochrome painting

1958 births
Living people
People from Žiar nad Hronom District
Slovak painters
Conceptual artists
Postmodern artists
Contemporary painters
Post-conceptual artists